Dan Murphy (born 1977) is an Irish hurler who played as a midfielder for the Cork senior team.

Born in Ballincollig, County Cork, Murphy first arrived on the inter-county scene at the age of seventeen when he first linked up with the Cork minor team, before later joining the under-21 and intermediate sides. He joined the senior panel during the 1997 championship. Murphy went on to play a bit part for Cork, and won one All-Ireland medal, one Munster medal and one National Hurling League medal as a non-playing substitute.

At club level Murphy is a one-time championship medallist in the intermediate grade with Ballincollig.

Throughout his career Murphy made just one championship appearance for Cork. He left the inter-county team following the conclusion of the 1999 championship.

Honours

Team

University College Cork
Fitzgibbon Cup (3): 1996, 1997, 1998

Ballincollig
Cork Intermediate Hurling Championship (1): 1999

Cork
All-Ireland Senior Hurling Championship (1): 1999 (sub)
Munster Senior Hurling Championship (1): 1999 (sub)
National Hurling League (1): 1998 (sub)
All-Ireland Intermediate Hurling Championship (1): 1997
Munster Intermediate Hurling Championship (1): 1997
All-Ireland Under-21 Hurling Championship (2): 1997 (c), 1998 (c)
Munster Under-21 Hurling Championship (3): 1996 (sub), 1997 (c), 1998 (c)
All-Ireland Minor Hurling Championship (1): 1995
Munster Minor Hurling Championship (1): 1995

References

1977 births
Living people
Ballincollig hurlers
Cork inter-county hurlers